Colby Mitchell Chester (February 29, 1844 – May 4, 1932) was a United States Navy admiral. He is the only naval officer to have actively served in the Civil War, the Spanish–American War, and World War I.

Early life
Chester was born in New London, Connecticut, on 29 February 1844, and graduated from the United States Naval Academy in 1863.

Military career
He served in the Navy for 46 more years.

Chester's active-service record was extended to February 28, 1909, to round out a full 50-year service career with the U.S. Navy.  He was recalled to special duty in 1917, during World War I, as the first commandant of the Navy ROTC units at Yale University and Brown University.

In 1923 he traveled to Turkey at the head of the Americans who participated in an agreement called the Chester concession.

Death
He died in Rye, New York, in 1932, and is buried at Arlington National Cemetery.

References

External links
 
 

1844 births
1932 deaths
People from New London, Connecticut
Union Navy officers
American military personnel of the Spanish–American War
American military personnel of World War I
United States Naval Academy alumni
United States Navy rear admirals (upper half)
Burials at Arlington National Cemetery